Gehle is a river of Lower Saxony and North Rhine-Westphalia, Germany. It flows into the Weser north of Petershagen.

See also
List of rivers of Lower Saxony

References

Rivers of Lower Saxony
Rivers of North Rhine-Westphalia
Rivers of Germany